Health//Disco is a remix album by American noise rock band Health.  It features remixes of songs from their debut album Health.

Track listing
"Triceratops (Acid Girls Rmx A)" - 5:03
"Lost Time (Pictureplane Rmx)" - 4:20
"Triceratops (Acid Girls Rmx B)" - 4:05
"Crimewave (Crystal Castles vs. Health)" - 4:32
"Heaven (Narctrax Rmx)" - 5:10
"Problem Is (Thrust Lab Rmx)" - 4:48
"Triceratops (CFCF Rmx)" - 3:35
"Lost Time (C.L.A.W.S. Rmx) - 7:46
"Tabloid Sores (Nosaj Thing Rmx)" - 2:30
"Heaven (Pink Skull Rmx)" - 5:13
"Perfect Skin (Curses! Rmx)" - 5:46

Also included with the CD edition of the album are 5 data-only tracks that can be accessed through a computer.

"Zoothorns (Nastique Rmx)" - 5:21
"Tabloid Sores (Lovely Chords Rmx)" - 5:30
"Crimewave (Bearded Baby Re-Rmx)" - 3:50
"Glitter Pills (Toxic Avenger Rmx)" - 3:01
"The Power of Health (Captain Ahab Rmx)" - 5:08

References

External links

Health (band) albums
2008 remix albums
Lovepump United albums